Chimarra obscura is a species of fingernet caddisfly in the family Philopotamidae. It is found in North America.

References

Trichoptera
Articles created by Qbugbot
Insects described in 1852